The 1965 Florida State Seminoles football team represented Florida State University in the 1965 NCAA University Division football season.

Schedule

References

Florida State
Florida State Seminoles football seasons
Florida State Seminoles football